The Rodalb, also called the Rodalbe, is a stream, just under  long, in West Palatinate in the German state of Rhineland-Palatinate. It is an orographically left tributary of the Schwarzbach.

Course 
To begin with it flows northeast, passing the villages of Lemberg and Ruppertsweiler. It then swings north, accompanies the B 10 federal highway, 2 kilometres away, and flows through Münchweiler. At Riegelbrunnerhof (a district of Münchweiler), it picks up the waters of the Merzalbe, its largest tributary, from the right and changes direction once again to head northwest, passing through the little town of Rodalben. Near the hamlet of  it discharges into the Schwarzbach from the left.

Sights 
 Lemberg Castle, built around 1200, in ruins since 1689
 Rodalben Rock Trail with a length - depending on the source – of 43  or 45 km 
 Bärenhöhle, "Bear Cave", the largest natural rock cave in the Palatinate region
 Bruderfelsen rocks, symbol of the town of Rodalben

See also 
List of rivers of Rhineland-Palatinate

References 

Rivers of Rhineland-Palatinate
Rivers and lakes of the Palatinate Forest
Rivers of Germany